Novlu is a village in the Qubadli Rayon of Azerbaijan.

Novlu is Azeri village in Qubadli

References 

Populated places in Qubadli District